2020 ITTF World Cup may refer to 

2020 ITTF Men's World Cup
2020 ITTF Women's World Cup